Notes From Elsewhere is an album from American singer/songwriter Peter Mulvey, released in 2007.

Notes from Elsewhere is a retrospective compilation of songs Mulvey has recorded and performed over his career. They have all been re-recorded solo in the studio with just acoustic guitar.

Track listing
All songs by Peter Mulvey unless noted.
 "Shirt" (David Goodrich, Peter Mulvey) – 3:32
 "Better Way to Go" – 3:42
 "The Dreams" – 1:50
 "Old Simon Stimson" – 2:57
 "Rapture" – 4:03
 "The Trouble with Poets" (Goodrich, Mulvey) – 3:32
 "Grace" (Goodrich, Mulvey) – 3:27
 "Black Rabbit" – 3:10
 "If Love Is Not Enough" – 4:07
 "The Knuckleball Suite" – 3:35
 "Every Word Except Goodbye" (Goodrich, Mulvey) – 3:57
 "Charlie" (Cebar, Goodrich, Mulvey) – 3:38
 "Tender Blindspot" – 4:05
 "On the Way Up – 3:49
 "Wings of the Ragman" (Goodrich, Mulvey) – 3:33
 "Words Too Small to Say" (Goodrich, Mulvey) – 3:47
 "Little Foot" – 1:29

Personnel
Peter Mulvey - acoustic guitar, vocals

Production notes
 Produced by Peter Mulvey
Engineered by Ric Probst and Al Williams
Mixed and mastered by Ric Probst
Design by Meghan Dewar

References

External links
Official Peter Mulvey website
Signature Sounds Recordings

2007 albums
Peter Mulvey albums